Out of Range is the fifth studio album by singer-songwriter Ani DiFranco, released in 1994. (see 1994 in music).

Track listing

Personnel
Ani DiFranco – acoustic guitar, percussion, piano, electric guitar, steel guitar, vocals
Colleen Allen – saxophone
Chris Brown – piano
Stephen Donald – trombone
Scot Fisher – accordion
Alisdair Jones – bass
Sarah McElcheran – trumpet
Andy Stochansky – dumbek, drums, backing vocals

Production
Ani DiFranco – record producer, art direction
Ed Stone – producer, engineer
Scot Fisher – photography

References

Ani DiFranco albums
1994 albums
Righteous Babe Records albums